Conor O'Brien may refer to:

 Conor O'Brien (died 1603), Irish nobleman and landowner
 Conor O'Brien (died 1651), Royalist Commander during the Irish Confederate Wars
 Edward Conor Marshall O'Brien (1880–1952), Irish aristocrat, republican, nationalist, sailor
 Conor Cruise O'Brien (1917–2008), Irish writer, politician, and diplomat
 Conor O'Brien, 18th Baron Inchiquin (born 1943), Irish peer
 Conor O'Brien (hurler) (born 1985), Tipperary intercounty player
 Conor O'Brien (soccer) (born 1988), American soccer player
 Conor O'Brien (rugby union) (born 1996), Irish rugby union player
 Conor O'Brien, Irish musician and member of Villagers

See also
 Connor O'Brien (disambiguation)
 Conor O'Brian, American wrestler